North Buena Vista is a city in Clayton County, Iowa, United States. The population was 109 at the time of the 2020 census, down from 124 in 2000.

Geography
North Buena Vista is located at  (42.679299, -90.956783).

Picnic
The Buenie Picnic has been held since 1929, on the Sunday of Labor Day weekend, as a benefit by the local Immaculate Conception Catholic Church. In 1971 the picnic was raided and parish priest Rev. Carl Ruhland was charged with "running a gambling house". He was fined $100. Following that incident, in 1973, the Iowa Legislature legalized bingo, raffles and other low-stakes games of chance.

Demographics

2010 census
As of the census of 2010, there were 121 people, 63 households, and 34 families living in the city. The racial makeup of the city was 98.3% White, 0.8% Asian, and 0.8% from two or more races.

There were 63 households, of which 9.5% had children under the age of 18 living with them, 47.6% were married couples living together, 6.3% had a female householder with no husband present, and 46.0% were non-families. 41.3% of all households were made up of individuals, and 6.4% had someone living alone who was 65 years of age or older. The average household size was 1.92 and the average family size was 2.53.

The median age in the city was 49.9 years. 12.4% of residents were under the age of 18; 5.8% were between the ages of 18 and 24; 14.9% were from 25 to 44; 45.4% were from 45 to 64; and 21.5% were 65 years of age or older. The gender makeup of the city was 57.0% male and 43.0% female.

2000 census
As of the census of 2000, there were 124 people, 54 households, and 34 families living in the city. The racial makeup of the city was 99.19% White, and 0.81% from two or more races. Hispanic or Latino of any race were 0.81% of the population.

There were 54 households, out of which 31.5% had children under the age of 18 living with them, 51.9% were married couples living together, 5.6% had a female householder with no husband present, and 35.2% were non-families. 25.9% of all households were made up of individuals, and 9.3% had someone living alone who was 65 years of age or older. The average household size was 2.30 and the average family size was 2.80.

In the city, the population was spread out, with 22.6% under the age of 18, 9.7% from 18 to 24, 31.5% from 25 to 44, 26.6% from 45 to 64, and 9.7% who were 65 years of age or older. The median age was 38 years. For every 100 females, there were 113.8 males. For every 100 females age 18 and over, there were 108.7 males.

The median income for a household in the city was $20,625, and the median income for a family was $38,750. Males had a median income of $21,875 versus $17,361 for females. The per capita income for the city was $12,729. There were 25.0% of families and 13.8% of the population living below the poverty line, including no under eighteens and none of those over 64.

Education
Public schools are operated by the Clayton Ridge Community School District, which formed in 2005 in the merger of the Guttenberg Community School District and the Garnavillo Community School District.

Immaculate Conception School, under the Roman Catholic Archdiocese of Dubuque, was in operation until it merged into St. Mary's Catholic School in Guttenberg in 1968.

Cemetery
The Immaculate Conception Catholic Cemetery is located on the top of a hill a short distance from the Immaculate Conception Church.
There is a Pioneer Cemetery aka old city cemetery Buena Vista, located off of country lane. https://www.google.com/maps/place/North+Buena+Vista,+IA/@42.678778,-90.9558171,17.64z/data=!4m5!3m4!1s0x87fcb7131a753625:0xf562c64150e75fb0!8m2!3d42.6797163!4d-90.9565171
According to the residents there were some old family cemeteries in N. Buena Vista, but supposedly the graves were moved to Immaculate Conception Cemetery years ago. Buenie residents also said; some old cemetery records of the past were lost during a terrible fire at the first church in N. Buena Vista Iowa. I could not find the date of the fire.

References

Cities in Clayton County, Iowa
Cities in Iowa
Iowa populated places on the Mississippi River